The Woman Who Invented Love (Italian: La donna che inventò l'amore) is a 1952 Italian historical melodrama film written and directed by Ferruccio Cerio and starring Silvana Pampanini, Rossano Brazzi and Mariella Lotti. It was shot at the Cinecittà Studios in Rome. The film's sets were designed by the art director Marcello Avenati.

Cast
Silvana Pampanini as Antonella
Rossano Brazzi as Conte Grilli
Juan de Landa as Usuraio Passadonato
Piero Carnabuci as Corteggiatore di Antonella
Mariella Lotti as Nini
Lauro Gazzolo as Marchese Doria
Vittorio Sanipoli as Caddulo
Laura Gore as Malvina
Wanda Capodaglio
Claudio Ermelli
Renato Chiantoni

References

Bibliography
 Poppi, Roberto. I registi: dal 1930 ai giorni nostri. Gremese Editore, 2002.

External links
 
 The Woman Who Invented Love at Variety Distribution

1952 films
1950s historical drama films
Italian historical drama films
1950s Italian-language films
Films set in the 1910s
Films shot at Cinecittà Studios
Films directed by Ferruccio Cerio
1952 drama films
Melodrama films
Italian black-and-white films
1950s Italian films